Eulogios Kourilas Lauriotes (1880–1961) was a bishop of the Orthodox Autocephalous Church of Albania. He was the Orthodox metropolitan bishop of Korçë (Korytsa) in Albania between 1937 and 1939, and a professor of philosophy and author on religious matters. He later became one of the leaders of the Northern Epirus movement, propagating that Greece should annex southern Albania.

Life
He was born in the village of Ziçisht (Zititsa, in Greek) (then Ottoman Empire, today in Albania) in 1880. He was of Greek  or Albanian origin. During his youth he was attracted by ascetic and monastic ideals and joined the monastic community of Mount Athos. He graduated from the local Athonite School (1901) and the Phanar Greek Orthodox College in Istanbul. He continued his studies in the Philosophy department of the University of Athens, where he acquired his Ph.D. in Humanities. He continued studies in Germany.  Kourilas also participated in the Greek Struggle for Macedonia and during the Balkan Wars (1912–1913) he was in charge of 100 armed men, among them many priests, that fought for Greece in the area of Chalkidiki.

After an agreement with the Albanian authorities, in 1937, the Ecumenical Patriarchate chose a number of highly educated religious personalities for key positions in the recently declared as autocephalous Orthodox Church of Albania. Among them where Panteleimon Kotokos as metropolitan of Gjirokastër and Eulogios Kourilas as metropolitan of Korçë. When the communist regime of Enver Hoxha came to power in Albania in 1945, he was declared an "enemy of the state" and was deprived from the Albanian citizenship. By then he was already living in Greece where, parallel to his academic work, together with Panteleimon Kotokos became the heads of the Northern Epirus Central Committee propagating that parts of southern Albania, known among Greeks as Northern Epirus should be awarded to Greece.
He became professor at School of Philosophy of the Aristotle University of Thessaloniki (1935–1937) and of the University of Athens (1942–1949).

He donated a significant part (10,000 volumes) of his library to the University of Ioannina.

He died in 1961, Stratonike, Chalkidiki.

Works 
Eulogios Kourilas wrote several historical, philosophical and theological books in Greek. His main works are (titles translated from Greek):
 History of Ascetism (1929)
 Catalogue of Kausokalyvia codices (1930)
 Albanian studies (1933)
 Gregorios Argyrokastritis (1935)
 Moschopolis and its New Academy (1935)
 Heraclea Sacra (1942) (title in Latin)
 Hellenism and Christianism (1944)
 Patriarchic History (1951).

References

External links
 Bibliography of Eulogios Kourilas. googleboks

1880 births
1961 deaths
People from Devoll (municipality)
Bishops of the Albanian Orthodox Church
20th-century Eastern Orthodox bishops
19th-century Albanian writers
20th-century Albanian writers
19th-century Greek writers
19th-century male writers
20th-century Greek writers
National and Kapodistrian University of Athens alumni
Greek Eastern Orthodox priests
Academic staff of the National and Kapodistrian University of Athens
Academic staff of the Aristotle University of Thessaloniki
People associated with Philotheou Monastery